Clivina bituberculata is a species of ground beetle in the subfamily Scaritinae. It was described by Jules Putzeys in 1866.

References

bituberculata
Beetles described in 1866